Alan Gould (born 22 March 1949) is a contemporary Australian novelist, essayist and poet.

Life and career
Gould was born in London to an English father and an Icelandic mother. His family lived in Northern Ireland, Germany and Singapore before arriving in Australia in 1966. He completed a BA at the Australian National University and a Diploma of Education at the then Canberra College of Advanced Education. Having worked as a nuclear physics technician and agricultural labourer, he began writing full-time in 1973, occasionally teaching and writing journalism.

Gould's first book of poems, Icelandic Solitaries, was published in 1978. Numerous volumes of poetry and fiction have followed, with his best known novel being To the Burning City (1991), about the relationship between two brothers, set in World War II. His work has been awarded the Kenneth Slessor Prize for Poetry (1981), the Foundation for Australian Literary Studies Best Book of the Year Award (1985), the National Book Council Banjo Award for Fiction (1992), the Royal Blind Society Audio Book of the Year Award (1999), the Philip Hodgins Memorial Award for contribution to Australian Literature (1999), and the Grace Leven Award For Poetry (2006 for The Past Completes Me - Selected Poems 1973-2003). His novel, The Schoonermaster's Dance, was joint winner of the ACT Book of the Year.
 
Later books include a novel, The Lakewoman, from Australian Scholarly Publishing, and a collection of poems, Folk Tunes, from Salt Publishing, both in 2009.  The Lakewoman was shortlisted for the 2010 Prime Minister's Literary Awards.  The Seaglass Spiral was published in 2012 by Finlay Lloyd, and in 2013 appeared a collection of poems and a comic opera libretto, Capital from Puncher & Wattmann, and a collection of essays, Joinery and Scrollwork: A Writer's Workbench from Quadrant Books.

In 2015 he published a picaresque novel, The Poet's Stairwell, Black Pepper publishing.

Bibliography

Poetry
Collections
 
 
 
 
 The Twofold Place (1986)
 Years Found in Likeness (1988)
 Formerlight (1992)
 Momentum (1992)
 Mermaid (1996)
 Dalliance and Scorn (1999)
 A Fold in the Light (2001)
 The Past Completes Me: Selected Poems 1973-2003 (2005) 
 Folk Tunes (2009)
 Capital (2013)
List of poems

Novels
 The Man Who Stayed Below (1984)
 To the Burning City (1991)
 Close Ups (1994)
 The Tazyrik Year (1998)
 The Schoonermaster's Dance (2001)  Review
 The Lakewoman (2009)
 The Seaglass Spiral (2012)
 The Poet's Stairwell (2015)

Short fiction 
Collections
 The Enduring Disguises: Three novellas (1988)
Stories

Non-fiction
 Three Streets in Search of an Author (1993)
 The Totem Ship (1996)
 Joinery and Scrollwork (2013)

References

External links
    Synopsis & extract of upcoming novel
 A Birdseye View of the Norwegian Sea another extract from The Seaglass Spiral
 More Short Takes at Quadrant
 On poets being paid for their work Essay with Geoff Page at Thylazine
 ‘Ballade for Alan Gould’ Poem by Alan Wearne
 Marching in the Streets Gould on protesting against the Vietnam War (Video & transcript)
 Interview with Alan Gould at The Chimaera. Other poems by Alan Gould and appreciations of his work at the same site.

1949 births
20th-century Australian novelists
20th-century Australian male writers
21st-century Australian novelists
Australian essayists
Male essayists
Australian male novelists
Australian National University alumni
Australian poets
Australian people of Icelandic descent
English emigrants to Australia
English people of Icelandic descent
University of Canberra alumni
Writers from the Australian Capital Territory
Living people
Australian male poets
Quadrant (magazine) people
20th-century essayists
21st-century essayists
21st-century Australian male writers